Goniophysetis malgassellus is a moth in the family Crambidae. It is found in Madagascar.

References

Cybalomiinae
Moths described in 1960